Alfred Marshall ( – October 2, 1868) was a United States representative from Maine. He was born in New Hampshire about 1797.  Marshall married Lydia Brackett on December 21, 1824, and they had three children Isabelle Isaphene Marshall, Jacob Smith Marshall, and John Brackett Marshall.

He was elected a member of the Maine House of Representatives in 1827, 1828, 1834, and 1835 and served as a general in the Maine State militia.

He was elected as a Democrat to the Twenty-seventh Congress (March 4, 1841 – March 3, 1843).  After his return to Maine, he became a collector at Belfast from 1846 to 1849.  He engaged in mercantile pursuits and the hotel business.  He died in China, Kennebec County on October 2, 1868.  He is interred in Village Cemetery.

Notes

References

 

1797 births
1868 deaths
People from China, Maine
New Hampshire Democrats
Members of the Maine House of Representatives
Democratic Party members of the United States House of Representatives from Maine
Burials in Maine
19th-century American politicians